Haider Khan is a fashion photographer and a director in the Indian film industry. Khan was the winner of the National Award, India, in the 2022 Sony World Photography Awards. His work was found notable and he was the only Indian to speak at the World Photography Organisation event PHOTO IS:RAEL in Israel.

Film 
His directorial debut feature film Rohingya - People from Nowhere was released on 15 November 2021 and has won International Awards.

Photography 
As a photographer he shot the launch campaign of Being Human and Being Strong and has shot cover photographs for magazines including GQ, Filmfare, Stardust, and People, and was the official photographer for events like Femina Miss India , Grasim Mr.India, and Gladrags Megamodel.

Awards and recognition 
Winner of 2022 Sony World Photography Awards
Winner/Gold at PX3 2021 Prix de la Photographie de Paris

Trivia 

 He was once sketched by famous Bollywood actor Salman Khan

References

External links 

 Official Website
 
 Haider Khan interview about his film Rohingya - People from Nowhere with Indian Express
Indian photographers
Indian film directors